Hyży is a Polish surname. Notable people with this surname include:
 Grzegorz Hyży (born 1987), Polish singer
 Julie Hyzy, American author of mystery fiction
 Maja Hyży (born 1989), Polish singer

See also
 

Polish-language surnames